Events from the year 1983 in Denmark.

Incumbents
 Monarch - Margrethe II
 Prime minister - Poul Schlüter

Events

Sports

Football
 21 September – Denmark achieves an important 1–0 win against England in Wembley Stadium in Group 3 of the UEFA Euro 1984 qualifying. Denmark's goal is scored by Allan Simonsen.
 16 November – Denmark qualifies for UEFA Euro 1984 by defeating Greece 2–0 in their last qualification game and thus winning Group 3 one point ahead of England.

Badminton
 2 May  The 1983 IBF World Championships takes place in Copenhagen.
Steen Fladberg and Jesper Helledie win gold in men's double
Steen Fladberg and Pia Nielsen win gold in mixed double.
 Gentofte BK wins Europe Cup.

Cycling
 13 July  Kim Andersen wins Stage 12 of the 1983 Tour de France.
 Gert Frank (DEN) and Patrick Sercu (BEL) win the Six Days of Copenhagen sox-day track cycling race.

Births
 15 May – Anne Lolk Thomsen, rower
 18 May – Agnete Kirk Thinggaard, dressage rider
 23 May – Joachim Persson, badminton player
 23 November – Kamilla Rytter Juhl, badminton player
 19 December – Mia Rosing, model

Deaths
 24 September – Lis Møller, journalist and politician (born 1918) 
 29 November – Aage Rasmussen, photographer and track and field athlete (born 1889)
 10 November – Carl Erik Soya, author and dramatist (born 1896)

See also
1983 in Danish television

References

 
Denmark
Years of the 20th century in Denmark
1980s in Denmark